The 1956 Campeonato Paulista da Primeira Divisão, organized by the Federação Paulista de Futebol, was the 55th season of São Paulo's top professional football league. Santos won the title for the third time. No teams were relegated and the top scorer was São Paulo's Zezinho with 18 goals.

Championship
The championship was disputed in three phases:

 Qualifying round: All eighteen teams played each other in a single-round robin system, with the ten best teams advancing to the Blue Series and the eight worst going on to dispute the White Series.
 Blue Series: The ten teams played each other in a double round-robin system, and the team with the most points won the title.
 White Series: The eight teams played each other in a double round-robin system, and the team with the fewest points was relegated.

Qualifying phase

Blue Series

Playoffs

White Series

Final standings

Top Scores

References

Campeonato Paulista seasons
Paulista